Leah Modigliani is an American and Canadian artist living in Philadelphia. Modigliani received an BFA in Studio Art from Concordia University, an MFA in Sculpture from the San Francisco Art Institute and a PhD in Art History and Criticism from Stony Brook University. Modigliani is currently Associate Professor and Program Director of Visual Studies at Tyler School of Art and Architecture at Temple University in Philadelphia.

Modigliani’s work draws from multiple disciplines such as Visual Arts, Art History, Cultural Studies, and Critical Geography. Her cultural productions refuse specialization, and she is equally noted for her accomplishments in the Visual Arts (sculpture, installation, and photography), academic scholarship and critical writing.

Modigliani's artwork has been exhibited at many galleries and museums including Pennsylvania Academy of the Fine Arts Museum (Philadelphia), Vox Populi (Philadelphia), Yerba Buena Center for the Arts (San Francisco), Colby College Museum of Art (Waterville, ME), the Art Gallery of Nova Scotia (Halifax), and the Museum of Contemporary Canadian Art (Toronto). Her work is in the collections of Pennsylvania Academy of the Fine Arts  and the Whitney Museum of American Art.

Her critical writing can be found in academic journals and contemporary art magazines such as Mapping Meaning, the Journal, Prefix Photo, Artnet, and C Magazine. Her book, Engendering an avant-garde; the unsettled landscapes of Vancouver photo-conceptualism, was published by Manchester University Press's Rethinking Art's Histories series in 2018.

References 

1970 births
Living people
Canadian sculptors
20th-century American sculptors
Concordia University alumni
Artists from New Haven, Connecticut
San Francisco Art Institute alumni
Stony Brook University alumni
Temple University faculty
21st-century American sculptors